The glucagon-like peptide-1 receptor (GLP1R) is a receptor protein found on beta cells of the pancreas and on neurons of the brain. It is involved in the control of blood sugar level by enhancing insulin secretion. In humans it is synthesised by the gene GLP1R, which is present on chromosome 6. It is a member of the glucagon receptor family of G protein-coupled receptors. GLP1R is composed of two domains, one extracellular (ECD) that binds the C-terminal helix of GLP-1, and one transmembrane (TMD) domain that binds the N-terminal region of GLP-1. In the TMD domain there is a fulcrum of polar residues that regulates the biased signaling of the receptor  while the transmembrane helical boundaries and extracellular surface are a trigger for biased agonism.

Human receptor ligands
GLP1R binds glucagon-like peptide-1 (GLP1) and glucagon as its natural endogenous agonists.

Receptor agonists:
GLP-1 – endogenous in humans
glucagon – endogenous in humans
Oxyntomodulin
exendin-4,
exenatide
lixisenatide
albiglutide
beinaglutide
dulaglutide
efpeglenatide
langlenatide
liraglutide
semaglutide
Taspoglutide
Pegapamodutide
Lithium chloride

Receptor antagonists:
[9-39]-GLP-1
"T-0632"
"GLP1R0017"

Receptor positive allosteric modulators:
"BETP"

Receptor negative allosteric modulators:

 "HTL26119"

Function and therapeutic potential

GLP1R is known to be expressed in pancreatic beta cells. Activated GLP1R stimulates the adenylyl cyclase pathway which results in increased insulin synthesis and release of insulin. Consequently, GLP1R has been a target for developing drugs usually referred to as GLP1R agonists to treat diabetes mellitus. Exendin-4 is one of the peptides used therapeutically to treat diabetes, and its biological binding mode to the GLP-1R has been demonstrated using genetically engineered amino acids.

GLP1R is also expressed in the brain where it is involved in the control of appetite. Furthermore, mice that over express GLP1R display improved memory and learning.

Stretch responsive vagal neurons in the stomach and intestines also express GLP1R. GLP1R neurons particularly and densely innervate stomach muscle and can communicate with additional organ systems changing breathing and heart rate due to activation.

Huntington's disease

The diabetic, pancreatic, and neuroprotection implications of GLP1R are also thought to be potential therapies for treating the diabetes and energy metabolism abnormalities associated with Huntington's disease affecting the brain and periphery. Exendin-4, an FDA-approved antidiabetic glucagon-like peptide 1 (GLP-1) receptor agonist, has been tested in mice with the mutated human huntingtin protein showing neurodegenerative changes, motor dysfunction, poor energy metabolism, and high blood glucose levels. Exendin-4 (Ex-4) treatment reduced the accumulation of mutated human huntingtin protein aggregates, improved motor function, extended the survival time, improved glucose regulation, and decreased brain and pancreas pathology.

Exendin-4 increases beta cell mass in the pancreatic islets to improve the release of insulin to ultimately increase glucose uptake. The mechanism regarding this insulin increase involves Ex-4 and GLP-1. When the islets in the pancreas are exposed to GLP-1, there is an increased expression of the anti-apoptotic gene bcl-2 and decreased expression of pro-apoptotic genes bax and caspase-3, which leads to greater cell survival. GLP-1 binding to its G protein-coupled receptor activates various different pathways including the growth factor receptor and is coupled to pathways stimulating mitogenesis. Some of these pathways include Rap, Erk1/2, MAPK, B-RAF, PI3-K, cAMP, PKA, and TORC2 that are activated to initiate exocytosis, proinsulin gene expression and translation, increase insulin biosynthesis, and genetically increase beta cell proliferation and neogenesis. The GLP-1R is a G protein-coupled receptor that is dependent on glucose and GLP-1 is a peptide hormone that acts directly on the beta cell to stimulate insulin secretion by activating signal transduction when glucose is present. When glucose is not present, this receptor no longer couples to stimulate insulin secretion in order to prevent hypoglycemia.

Relating glucose metabolism and insulin sensitivity back to Huntington's disease, increased insulin release and beta cell proliferation by a GLP-1 agonist, Ex-4, helps combat the damage done by mutant htt in peripheral tissues. Htt aggregation decreases beta cell mass and thus impairs insulin release and increases blood glucose levels. Disruption of glycemic homeostasis then affects nutrient availability to neurons and alters neuron function contributing to neurodegeneration and motor problems seen in Huntington's disease. The health of the nervous system is related to metabolic health, thus a diabetes medication as a Huntington's disease treatment is a potential treatment. Ex-4 easily crosses the blood-brain barrier and GLP-1 and Ex-4 have been shown to act on neurons in the brain by exerting neuroprotective actions.

In studies with Huntington's disease mice, daily treatments of Ex-4 significantly reduced glucose levels compared to those mice treated with saline. It also increased insulin sensitivity by about 50%, improved insulin-stimulated glucose uptake, and protect pancreatic beta cell function. Huntington's disease has also been linked to imbalances in leptin and ghrelin levels. Ex-4 restored ghrelin levels and also lowered leptin levels allowing Huntington's disease mice to eat more and counteract symptomatic weight loss. This treatment restored beta cell cells and islet structure, reduce mutated human huntingtin aggregates in the brain and pancreas, and also improve motor function seen by the increased activity level of the mice. Improvements were found in the areas of the body that expressed GLP-1R. In addition to its other effects on the Huntington's disease mouse model, daily treatment of Ex-4, the GLP-1R agonist, significantly delayed the onset of mortality and extended the lifespan by approximately one month.

See also 
Glucagon-like peptide-1
Dipeptidyl peptidase-4

References

Further reading

External links 
 

 

G protein-coupled receptors